Delhi P. Sunder Rajan is a violinist-vocalist of India performing South Indian Classical music (Carnatic music) . He is known for his improvisations and style of playing.

References

External links
 Sunder Rajan. Official Website.
 Concert recording

Tamil musicians
People from Delhi
Carnatic violinists
Living people
21st-century violinists
21st-century Indian male singers
21st-century Indian singers
Year of birth missing (living people)